Sakhteman-e Khunriz (also Romanized as Sākhtemān-e Khūnrīz) is a village in Aviz Rural District, in the Central District of Farashband County, Fars Province, Iran. At the 2006 census, its population was 34, in 7 families.

References 

Populated places in Farashband County